The following species in the flowering plant genus Acalypha are accepted by Plants of the World Online. A taxonomically relevant feature of the genus is the presence of epidermal crystals in their leaves.

Acalypha abingdonii 
Acalypha acapulcensis 
Acalypha accedens 
Acalypha acmophylla 
Acalypha acrogyna 
Acalypha acuminata 
Acalypha adenostachya 
Acalypha aliena 
Acalypha allenii 
Acalypha almadinensis 
Acalypha alopecuroidea 
Acalypha ambigua 
Acalypha amblyodonta 
Acalypha amentacea 
Acalypha amplexicaulis 
Acalypha ampliata 
Acalypha anadenia 
Acalypha anemioides 
Acalypha angatensis 
Acalypha angustata 
Acalypha angustifolia 
Acalypha angustissima 
Acalypha annobonae 
Acalypha apetiolata 
Acalypha apodanthes 
Acalypha arciana 
Acalypha argentii 
Acalypha argomuelleri 
Acalypha aronioides 
Acalypha arvensis 
Acalypha aspericocca 
Acalypha australis 
Acalypha bailloniana 
Acalypha balansae 
Acalypha balgooyi 
Acalypha baretiae 
Acalypha beckii 
Acalypha benguelensis 
Acalypha berteroana 
Acalypha bipartita 
Acalypha bisetosa 
Acalypha boinensis 
Acalypha boiviniana 
Acalypha boliviensis 
Acalypha botteriana 
Acalypha brachyclada 
Acalypha brachystachya 
Acalypha brasiliensis 
Acalypha brevibracteata 
Acalypha brevicaulis 
Acalypha buddleifolia 
Acalypha bullata 
Acalypha burmanii 
Acalypha burquezii 
Acalypha bussei 
Acalypha caeciliae 
Acalypha californica 
Acalypha caperonioides 
Acalypha capillipes 
Acalypha capitata 
Acalypha cardiophylla 
Acalypha carrascoana 
Acalypha carthagenensis 
Acalypha castroviejoi 
Acalypha caturus 
Acalypha ceraceopunctata 
Acalypha chamaedrifolia 
Acalypha chaquensis 
Acalypha chiapensis 
Acalypha chibomboa 
Acalypha chirindica 
Acalypha chlorocardia 
Acalypha chocoana 
Acalypha chordantha 
Acalypha chorisandra 
Acalypha chuniana 
Acalypha ciliata 
Acalypha cincta 
Acalypha cinerea 
Acalypha claoxyloides 
Acalypha claussenii 
Acalypha clutioides 
Acalypha coleispica 
Acalypha communis 
Acalypha comonduana 
Acalypha confertiflora 
Acalypha conspicua 
Acalypha contermina 
Acalypha costaricensis 
Acalypha crenata 
Acalypha × cristata 
Acalypha crockeri 
Acalypha cubensis 
Acalypha cuneata 
Acalypha cuprea 
Acalypha cupricola 
Acalypha cuspidata 
Acalypha dalzellii 
Acalypha deamii 
Acalypha decaryana 
Acalypha decumbens 
Acalypha delgadoana 
Acalypha delicata 
Acalypha delpyana 
Acalypha deltoidea 
Acalypha depauperata 
Acalypha depressinervia 
Acalypha dewevrei 
Acalypha dictyoneura 
Acalypha digynostachya 
Acalypha dikuluwensis 
Acalypha diminuta 
Acalypha dimorpha 
Acalypha dioica 
Acalypha distans 
Acalypha divaricata 
Acalypha diversifolia 
Acalypha dregei 
Acalypha dumetorum 
Acalypha eastmostpointensis 
Acalypha echinus 
Acalypha ecklonii 
Acalypha elizabethiae 
Acalypha elliptica 
Acalypha elskensii 
Acalypha emirnensis 
Acalypha engleri 
Acalypha erecta 
Acalypha eremorum 
Acalypha eriophylla 
Acalypha eriophylloides 
Acalypha erubescens 
Acalypha euphrasiostachys 
Acalypha fasciculata 
Acalypha ferdinandi 
Acalypha filiformis 
Acalypha filipes 
Acalypha fimbriata 
Acalypha firmula 
Acalypha fissa 
Acalypha flaccida 
Acalypha flagellata 
Acalypha flavescens 
Acalypha floresensis 
Acalypha forbesii 
Acalypha forsteriana 
Acalypha fournieri 
Acalypha fragilis 
Acalypha fredericii 
Acalypha fruticosa 
Acalypha fulva 
Acalypha fuscescens 
Acalypha gaumeri 
Acalypha gentlei 
Acalypha gibsonii 
Acalypha gigantesca 
Acalypha gillespieae 
Acalypha gillmanii 
Acalypha glabrata 
Acalypha glandulifolia 
Acalypha glandulosa 
Acalypha glechomifolia 
Acalypha gossweileri 
Acalypha gracilens 
Acalypha gracilipes 
Acalypha gracilis 
Acalypha grandibracteata 
Acalypha grandis 
Acalypha grisea 
Acalypha grisebachiana 
Acalypha grueningiana 
Acalypha guatemalensis 
Acalypha guineensis 
Acalypha gummifera 
Acalypha hainanensis 
Acalypha haploclada 
Acalypha hassleriana 
Acalypha havanensis 
Acalypha helenae 
Acalypha hellwigii 
Acalypha herzogiana 
Acalypha hibiscifolia 
Acalypha hispida 
Acalypha hochstetteriana 
Acalypha homblei 
Acalypha huillensis 
Acalypha humbertii 
Acalypha hutchinsonii 
Acalypha hypogaea 
Acalypha inaequilatera 
Acalypha indica 
Acalypha infesta 
Acalypha inselbergensis 
Acalypha insulana 
Acalypha integrifolia 
Acalypha intermedia 
Acalypha isaloensis 
Acalypha jerzedowskii 
Acalypha jubifera 
Acalypha juruana 
Acalypha karwinskii 
Acalypha katharinae 
Acalypha kerrii 
Acalypha klotzschii 
Acalypha × koraensis 
Acalypha laevigata 
Acalypha lagascana 
Acalypha lagoensis 
Acalypha lagopus 
Acalypha lamiana 
Acalypha lanceolata 
Acalypha lancetillae 
Acalypha langiana 
Acalypha laxiflora 
Acalypha leandrii 
Acalypha leicesterfieldiensis 
Acalypha leonii 
Acalypha lepidopagensis 
Acalypha lepinei 
Acalypha leptoclada 
Acalypha leptomyura 
Acalypha leptopoda 
Acalypha leptorhachis 
Acalypha liebmanniana 
Acalypha lignosa 
Acalypha lindeniana 
Acalypha linearifolia 
Acalypha longipes 
Acalypha longipetiolata 
Acalypha longispica 
Acalypha longispicata 
Acalypha longistipularis 
Acalypha lovelandii 
Acalypha lycioides 
Acalypha lyonsii 
Acalypha machiensis 
Acalypha macrodonta 
Acalypha macrostachya 
Acalypha macrostachyoides 
Acalypha macularis 
Acalypha maestrensis 
Acalypha mairei 
Acalypha malabarica 
Acalypha × malawiensis 
Acalypha manniana 
Acalypha marginata 
Acalypha marissima 
Acalypha martiana 
Acalypha matsudae 
Acalypha mayottensis 
Acalypha medibracteata 
Acalypha melochiifolia 
Acalypha membranacea 
Acalypha menavody 
Acalypha mentiens 
Acalypha mexicana 
Acalypha michoacanensis 
Acalypha microcephala 
Acalypha microphylla 
Acalypha mogotensis 
Acalypha mollis 
Acalypha monococca 
Acalypha monostachya 
Acalypha mortoniana 
Acalypha muelleriana 
Acalypha multicaulis 
Acalypha multifida 
Acalypha multispicata 
Acalypha mutisii 
Acalypha nana 
Acalypha neeana 
Acalypha nemorum 
Acalypha neomexicana 
Acalypha neptunica 
Acalypha nervulosa 
Acalypha noronhae 
Acalypha novoguineensis 
Acalypha nubicola 
Acalypha nusbaumeri 
Acalypha nyasica 
Acalypha oblancifolia 
Acalypha obscura 
Acalypha ocymoides 
Acalypha oligantha 
Acalypha oligodonta 
Acalypha omissa 
Acalypha oreopola 
Acalypha ornata 
Acalypha oxyodonta 
Acalypha padifolia 
Acalypha pallescens 
Acalypha palmeri 
Acalypha pancheriana 
Acalypha paniculata 
Acalypha papillosa 
Acalypha parvula 
Acalypha patens 
Acalypha paucifolia 
Acalypha paupercula 
Acalypha peckoltii 
Acalypha pedemontana 
Acalypha peduncularis 
Acalypha pendula 
Acalypha perrieri 
Acalypha persimilis 
Acalypha peruviana 
Acalypha pervilleana 
Acalypha phleoides 
Acalypha phyllonomifolia 
Acalypha pilosa 
Acalypha pippenii 
Acalypha pittieri 
Acalypha platyphylla 
Acalypha pleiogyne 
Acalypha plicata 
Acalypha pohliana 
Acalypha poiretii 
Acalypha polymorpha 
Acalypha polystachya 
Acalypha portoricensis 
Acalypha pruinosa 
Acalypha pruriens 
Acalypha psamofila 
Acalypha pseudalopecuroides 
Acalypha pseudovagans 
Acalypha psilostachya 
Acalypha pubiflora 
Acalypha pulchrespicata 
Acalypha pulogensis 
Acalypha punctata 
Acalypha purpurascens 
Acalypha purpusii 
Acalypha pycnantha 
Acalypha pygmaea 
Acalypha rabesahalana 
Acalypha radians 
Acalypha radicans 
Acalypha radinostachya 
Acalypha radula 
Acalypha rafaelensis 
Acalypha raivavensis 
Acalypha rapensis 
Acalypha reflexa 
Acalypha repanda 
Acalypha retifera 
Acalypha rheedei 
Acalypha rhombifolia 
Acalypha rhomboidea 
Acalypha richardiana 
Acalypha riedeliana 
Acalypha rivularis 
Acalypha rottleroides 
Acalypha rubrinervis 
Acalypha rubroserrata 
Acalypha ruderalis 
Acalypha ruiziana 
Acalypha rupestris 
Acalypha sabulicola 
Acalypha salicifolia 
Acalypha salicina 
Acalypha salvadorensis 
Acalypha salviifolia 
Acalypha saxicola 
Acalypha scabrosa 
Acalypha scandens 
Acalypha schiedeana 
Acalypha schlechtendaliana 
Acalypha schlechteri 
Acalypha schlumbergeri 
Acalypha schneideriana 
Acalypha schreiteri 
Acalypha schultesii 
Acalypha segetalis 
Acalypha sehnemii 
Acalypha seleriana 
Acalypha seminuda 
Acalypha senilis 
Acalypha septemloba 
Acalypha sericea 
Acalypha sessilifolia 
Acalypha setosa 
Acalypha siamensis 
Acalypha simplicistyla 
Acalypha skutchii 
Acalypha sonderi 
Acalypha sonderiana 
Acalypha spachiana 
Acalypha spectabilis 
Acalypha stachyura 
Acalypha stellata 
Acalypha stenoloba 
Acalypha stenophylla 
Acalypha stricta 
Acalypha striolata 
Acalypha subcastrata 
Acalypha subintegra 
Acalypha subsana 
Acalypha subscandens 
Acalypha subterranea 
Acalypha subtomentosa 
Acalypha subviscida 
Acalypha swallowensis 
Acalypha synoica 
Acalypha tacanensis 
Acalypha tenuicauda 
Acalypha tenuifolia 
Acalypha tenuiramea 
Acalypha tomentosa 
Acalypha trachyloba 
Acalypha tremula 
Acalypha tricholoba 
Acalypha trilaciniata 
Acalypha triloba 
Acalypha uleana 
Acalypha umbrosa 
Acalypha urophylla 
Acalypha urostachya 
Acalypha vagans 
Acalypha vallartae 
Acalypha variabilis 
Acalypha vellamea 
Acalypha velutina 
Acalypha venezuelica 
Acalypha verbenacea 
Acalypha veronicoides 
Acalypha villicaulis 
Acalypha villosa 
Acalypha virgata 
Acalypha virginica 
Acalypha volkensii 
Acalypha vulneraria 
Acalypha websteri 
Acalypha weddelliana 
Acalypha welwitschiana 
Acalypha wigginsii 
Acalypha wilderi 
Acalypha wilkesiana 
Acalypha wilmsii 
Acalypha wui 
Acalypha zeyheri 
Acalypha zollingeri

References

Acalypha